Thomas P. Lewis (March 17, 1940 – April 4, 2008) was an artist and peace activist, primarily noted for his participation with the Baltimore Four and the Catonsville Nine.

Biography
Lewis was born in Uniontown, Pennsylvania and raised in Baltimore, Maryland. He graduated from the Catholic Mount Saint Joseph High School there and took courses at several universities in Baltimore, as well as studying art informally with Earl Hofmann and  Joe Sheppard. Before his career as an activist he also visited Italy and was inspired by works in the Uffizi Gallery.

Lewis traced his life in activism back to a protest against the segregated Gwynn Oak Amusement Park in 1963, which he had intended on sketching as a journalist for Catholic publications before feeling compelled to participate. He subsequently joined the CORE, the Prince of Peace Plowshares, and developed close ties with the Catholic Worker Movement. His art became political accordingly, without severing ties with his religious background; in one example, in 1965 he made a woodcut of an antiwar speech Pope Paul VI made at the United Nations.

Baltimore Four
In the late 60s, he was involved in "actions" against the war, first as the Baltimore Four, who poured blood on draft files at the Baltimore Customs House in 1967. On October 27, 1967, the "Baltimore Four" (Lewis; Christian anarchist Philip Berrigan; poet, teacher and writer David Eberhardt; and United Church of Christ missionary and pastor, the Reverend James L. Mengel) poured blood (blood from several of the four, but additionally blood purchased from the Gay St. Market: poultry blood, according to the FBI, used by the Polish for soup) on Selective Service records in the Baltimore Customs House. Mengel agreed to the action and donated blood, but decided not to actually pour blood; instead he distributed the paperback Good News for Modern Man (a version of the New Testament) to draft board workers, newsmen, and police.  As they waited for the police to arrive and arrest them, the group passed out Bibles and calmly explained to draft board employees the reasons for their actions.

Catonsville Nine and prison
While on trial for this protest, Lewis engaged in a more daring one with the Catonsville Nine, who "napalmed" draft files in Catonsville, Maryland. One week later he was sentenced to six years in federal prison for the Baltimore Four protest, and in November 1968 to another three and a half years for the Catonsville Nine. He was ultimately released in 1971, serving out his sentence chiefly at the minimum-security prison farm at Lewisburg Federal Penitentiary.

While in prison Lewis continued to produce art, including over one hundred portraits of his fellow inmates, which he always produced in duplicate to allow his subjects to keep one themselves. The culmination of his work there was a portfolio of etchings, The Trial and Prison, published in fifty copies to raise funds for the movement in 1969, while Lewis was briefly out on appeal. Produced in a prison art studio Lewis had to share with mafia members (for whom it doubled as stash house for smuggled wine and spaghetti), at times using ink of his own concoction from ashes, coffee or cocoa powder, the etchings depict the psychic distress of his fellow inmates and ghostly, near apocalyptic confrontations between police and protestors. The text was written by Lewis, and the cover printed by Corita Kent.

Lewis was a well-known artist throughout the Worcester area, running printmaking workshops at the Worcester Art Museum for almost twenty years. Many of his pieces still survive in galleries and archives throughout the USA. He was an art teacher at Anna Maria College, and he taught printmaking at the Cambridge School of Weston, and Worcester Art Museum. Baltimore artist Earl Hofmann instructed Lewis in art during the 1960s.

Lewis was a memorable figure in the "radical Catholic" movement for his combination of art and activism; for example, Daniel Berrigan described his art as "…a poignant and powerful witness to the survival of the endangered conscience…. He heals the ancient split between ethics and imagination."

PeaceChain 18
The day after the invasion of Iraq on March 21, 2003, Lewis and 17 other activists using the PeaceChain blocked the Natick Chemical Weapons Research Laboratory and were arrested.  Lewis spoke eloquently before the Judge during the trial about the consequences of the invasion.  He, along with the other members of PeaceChain 18, was convicted for illegal trespass and disturbing the peace.  The direct action was organized by the Peace Abbey of Sherborn, Massachusetts.

Transform Now Plowshares
In July 2012, when Megan Rice, Gregory Boertje-Obed, and Michael Walli entered the Y-12 National Security Complex to perform a Plowshares movement action known as Transform Now Plowshares, they carried Lewis's banked blood in baby bottles, mixed with their own blood and poultry blood.

Personal
He dearly loved his family, and they became a huge part of his life. He often said that his pride and glory was his daughter, Nora Lewis Borbely, and that she was by far his greatest accomplishment. Lewis died at age 68 in his sleep on April 4, 2008.  A portion of his cremated remains is buried at the Conscientious Objectors cemetery on the grounds of the Pacifist Memorial in Sherborn, Massachusetts.

See also
List of peace activists

Sources
 Berrigan, Daniel (1970). The Trial of the Catonsville Nine. Boston: Beacon Press. .
 Berrigan, Daniel (1983). 'Nightmare of God. Portland: Sunburst Press. .
 Lynd, Straughton; & Lynd, Alice (Eds.) (1995). Nonviolence in America: A Documentary History''. Maryknoll, NY: Orbis Books.

References

External links
Obituary by Scott Schaeffer-Duffy
Photographs
Obituary in the Baltimore Sun
Tom Lewis Remembered

1940 births
2008 deaths
American anti–Vietnam War activists
American anti-war activists
American pacifists
Anna Maria College faculty
Artists from Baltimore
Roman Catholic activists